Blanc F. Joubert (1816–1885) was a politician in Louisiana.

In 1872 he testified in a congressional investigation. He served as a tax assessor in New Orleans.

His family members litigated whether they were Black.

References 

Louisiana local politicians
1816 births
1885 deaths